Sverð is the  Old Norse term for "sword". It may refer to
the Viking Sword.
the stage name of Steinar Sverd Johnsen